George Willis Pack (born 1831, Peterboro, New York; d. August 31, 1906, Southampton, Long Island, New York) was a second-generation timberman on Michigan's Lower Peninsula. Building on his father's legacy, over the course of several decades, Pack successfully developed his timber businesses, becoming one of Michigan's first millionaires. His son, Charles Lathrop Pack, and his grandson, Randolph Greene Pack, carried on the family tradition.

Life and career 

His father, George Pack, Jr. had established two sawmills outside of Lexington, Michigan, in a place known as Pack's Mills.

After years of working with the elder Pack, in 1860 George Willis Pack, together with John L. Woods, established Carrington, Pack & Company, in Sand Beach, Michigan.

In 1864, with Woods and Jeremiah Jenks, George Willis Pack established a second sawmill, Pack, Jenks & Company, also near Sand Beach.

A third firm, Woods & Company, in Port Crescent, Michigan, was formed in 1870.

In 1876, Pack, Woods & Company was formed in Oscoda, Michigan, on the Au Sable River.

George Willis Pack grew to be a wealthy man. He "would be remembered as one of the few millionaires who had lived in Huron County.

The public square in Asheville, North Carolina dates to 1797. Pack gave land for a new Buncombe County courthouse, which was completed in 1903 and no longer stands. A condition of this gift was that the former courthouse site become part of the public square, and the area was named Pack Square as a result. Pack also donated much of the cost of a monument to former North Carolina Governor Zebulon Baird Vance.

Firms, places, and dates

 Carrington, Pack & Company, Sand Beach, Michigan, 1860–70
 Pack, Jenks & Company, Sand Beach, Michigan, 1864–70
 Woods & Company, Port Crescent, Michigan, 1870–78
 Pack, Woods & Company, Oscoda, Michigan, 1878–1901

Landholdings

 Huron County, Michigan -  of timber
 Pinnebog River, Michigan -  of pine lands

External links
 "George Willis Pack: A Name That Will Endure", A Virtual Exhibit, University of North Carolina at Asheville, August 2006

References

Notes

Bibliography

 Eyle, Alexandra. 1992. Charles Lathrop Pack: Timberman, Forest Conservationist, and Pioneer in Forest Education. Syracuse, NY: ESF College Foundation and College of Environmental Science and Forestry. Distributed by Syracuse University Press. Available: Google books

1831 births
1906 deaths
Businesspeople in timber
History of forestry in the United States
People from Peterboro, New York
People from Sanilac County, Michigan
Businesspeople from Cleveland
People from Asheville, North Carolina
19th-century American businesspeople